Ruud Gullit (born Rudi Dil; 1 September 1962) is a Dutch footballer and subsequent manager who played professionally in the 1980s and 1990s as a defender, midfielder or forward. He is widely regarded as one of the greatest players of all time. In 2004, he was named one of the Top 125 greatest living footballers as part of FIFA's 100th anniversary celebration.

He captained the Netherlands national team that was victorious at UEFA Euro 1988 and was also a member of the squad for the 1990 FIFA World Cup and Euro 1992.

At club level, in 1987 he moved from PSV to AC Milan for a world record transfer fee. Nicknamed "the black Tulip", he was part of a notable Dutch trio at Milan which included Marco van Basten and Frank Rijkaard. Gullit won three Serie A titles and two European Cups with Milan. In 1995, he signed for Chelsea and a year later was appointed the club's player-manager. In his debut season, he led Chelsea to FA Cup success, the club's first major title for 26 years, and in doing so became the first overseas manager to win the FA Cup.

Gullit won the Ballon d'Or in 1987 and was named the World Soccer Player of the Year in 1987 and 1989. Normally an attacking midfielder, he was a versatile player, playing in numerous positions during his career.

Early life 

Gullit was born as Rudi Dil in Amsterdam to George Gullit, a Surinamese who arrived in the Netherlands with Herman Rijkaard (father of Frank Rijkaard), and Dutch mistress Ria Dil from the Jordaan district of Amsterdam. The Gullit family lived in one split level room on the top floor of a small apartment building. Gullit's father worked as an economics teacher at a local school, his mother as a custodian at the Rijksmuseum.

Gullit developed his football skills in the confines of the Rozendwarsstraat, and street football was instrumental in his formative years. Gullit's first team were the Meerboys, where he joined as a junior in 1970. At the age of ten, however, Gullit moved from the Jordaan to Amsterdam Old West where he played street football alongside Frank Rijkaard. Gullit joined the DWS club after his move, and came to the attention of the Dutch youth team, where he played alongside future full international teammates, Erwin Koeman, Ronald Koeman and Wim Kieft.

It was during his time at DWS that Gullit first took to using his father's surname, rather than his registered surname (from his mother), as he thought Gullit sounded more like a football player. However he retained his mother's surname, officially, and continues to sign all contracts as Ruud Dil.

Club career

HFC Haarlem 
September 22nd 1978, Gullit signed professionally for HFC Haarlem under coach and former West Bromwich Albion player Barry Hughes. Gullit made 91 league appearances for Haarlem, scoring 32 goals. He made his debut for the club at just 16 years and 11 months old, on August 19th 1979 (Haarlem-MVV Maastricht 2-2), becoming at the time the youngest player in the history of the Eredivisie. In his first year at Haarlem, the club finished bottom of the Eredivisie, but bounced back the following season winning the Eerste Divisie. Gullit was named as the best player in the Eerste Divisie that season. In the 1981–82 season, Gullit was in fine form as Haarlem finished fourth and qualified for Europe for the only time in their history. In that same season, Gullit scored the goal he would later consider his finest: "Playing against Utrecht I went past four defenders and then the goalkeeper, and scored. It was an unforgettable goal for me." Hughes was so impressed with the young Gullit that he described him as the "Dutch Duncan Edwards".

Feyenoord 

The young Gullit was considered as a signing by English sides Arsenal and Ipswich Town, but managers Terry Neill and Bobby Robson turned him down. Neill later told that he considered £30,000 too much for "this wild kid". Gullit therefore moved to Feyenoord in 1982, where he made 85 league appearances, scoring 31 goals. At Feyenoord, Gullit found himself playing in his second season 1983/84, alongside Dutch legend Johan Cruyff, while the assistant manager was Wim van Hanegem, and they were to leave a lasting impression.

Gullit's first season saw Feyenoord miss out on major honours, but the following year they completed the league and cup double. Gullit was named Dutch Footballer of the Year in recognition of his contribution to Feyenoord's success. At Feyenoord, Gullit occupied an increasingly advanced role in midfield, having played predominantly as a sweeper at Haarlem. While at Feyenoord, Gullit became the focus of a race row as manager Thijs Libregts was alleged to have referred to Gullit as "blackie" and criticised him for being lazy, though Libregts defended himself by claiming that it was merely a nickname. While playing for Feyenoord at St Mirren in September 1983, he was racially abused and spat on by supporters of the Scottish club. Gullit called it "the saddest night of my life".

PSV 
In 1985, Gullit moved to PSV for 1.2 million Dutch guilders and wound up scoring 46 goals in 68 league appearances for the team. Gullit was again named Footballer of the Year in 1986 as he helped PSV capture the Eredivisie crown, a feat they repeated the following year. It was at PSV that Gullit really began to establish himself as a world class footballer and his distinctive, dreadlocked appearance made certain that he would catch the eye of Europe's biggest clubs. Gullit was also singled out for criticism by large numbers of Feyenoord supporters, who branded him a "wolf" and accused him of moving to Eindhoven for money.

A.C. Milan 

Gullit signed for A.C. Milan in 1987, paying the then world record transfer fee of 18 million guilders as a replacement for Ray Wilkins. Milan's club president Silvio Berlusconi had an ambition to revive the fortunes of the Italian club which had stagnated after its glory days in the 1960s. Among Gullit's teammates at the club were compatriot Marco van Basten, who came at the same time. Later, they were joined by fellow compatriot, close friend as well as Ajax teammate of van Basten, Frank Rijkaard. The club also had a young Paolo Maldini, along with a more experienced Franco Baresi. Gullit's exploits with first PSV and then Milan helped him win the Ballon d'Or award in 1987 which he dedicated to Nelson Mandela.

When he first arrived at Milan, Gullit initially struggled to fit in as he spoke no Italian and was new to living in a foreign country. Gullit's first season at Milan, however, saw the club win the Scudetto for the first time in nine years, under coach Arrigo Sacchi. Initially used on the right of an attacking trio alongside van Basten and Pietro Virdis, after van Basten received an injury it was changed to a front two. The following season Milan built on their domestic success by adding the European Cup to their list of honours. Their scintillating 5–0 demolition of Real Madrid in the second leg of the semi-finals came at a cost, as Gullit suffered an injury and required surgery to be fit in time for the final. That performance was followed by a 4–0 victory over Steaua București in the 1989 final, with Gullit scoring two crucial goals. The following year, Milan retained the trophy as they defeated Benfica in the 1990 final. However, serious injuries sustained to the ligaments of his right knee limited Gullit's playing time, only managed just two domestic games in the 1989–90 season before appearing in the cup final.

In 1990–91, Milan's pursuit of a third consecutive European Cup was cut short by Marseille at the quarter-final stage. Having drawn the first leg at the San Siro, Milan trailed to a Chris Waddle goal with little time remaining when the floodlights went out. After a short delay the lighting was restored, but Milan had returned to their dressing room and refused to return to complete the game. UEFA awarded Marseille a 3–0 victory and expelled Milan from all European competitions for the following season.

While Milan continued their domestic dominance by winning the scudetto in both 1991–92 (a season in which they went undefeated) and 1992–93, Gullit's position became an increasingly peripheral one under new coach Fabio Capello. This was demonstrated by his omission from the 1993 Champions League final in which Milan lost to Marseille, as under the UEFA rules clubs were only allowed to field three foreigners, which was later abolished after the decision of the Bosman ruling.

Torino was interested in signing him, with the chairman claiming that an agreement with Milan was likely. Bayern Munich was also in talks with Gullit, but fell through. Instead, Gullit was loaned to Sampdoria.

Sampdoria 

In 1993, Gullit moved to Sampdoria and led them to victory in the Coppa Italia in the 1993–94 season. He also scored the winner in a 3–2 victory over Milan. Gullit was briefly re-signed by Milan in 1994, but quickly returned to Sampdoria before the culmination of the 1994–95 season. During his time, he served under manager Sven-Göran Eriksson and the two had a strong understanding and mutual respect. In his brief time at Sampdoria, he scored 15 goals.

Chelsea 
In July 1995, Gullit signed for Chelsea on a free transfer. Initially played as sweeper by manager Glenn Hoddle with limited success, Gullit was moved to his more familiar role in midfield, where he scored six goals. The signing of Gullit, alongside the likes of Mark Hughes and Dan Petrescu, propelled Chelsea to the semi-final of the FA Cup but their league form was disappointing.

Gullit had some difficulties adapting to the style of play at Chelsea: "I would take a difficult ball, control it, make space and play a good ball in front of the right back, except that he didn't want that pass. Eventually Glenn said to me, 'Ruud, it would be better if you do these things in midfield.'" His adjustment, however, was rapid and he ended the season by being named runner-up to Eric Cantona as Footballer of the Year.

Gullit has since often stated in interviews that it was in London he enjoyed his career the most and felt happiest: "Every time I played for Chelsea, I thought, 'Nice game, beautiful stadium, great crowd, I'm playing well.' It was the only time I really had fun." In moving to Chelsea, Gullit played an important part in the "foreign revolution" as numerous high-profile international stars, such as Italian Gianfranco Zola and Dutchman Dennis Bergkamp, joined Chelsea and Arsenal respectively, which helped to increase its worldwide profile.

International career 

In 1981, on his 19th birthday, Gullit made his international debut as a substitute for the Netherlands national team against Switzerland, a game the Dutch lost 2–1. During his early international career, the team failed to qualify for both the 1982 FIFA World Cup and UEFA Euro 1984 - missing out on the latter tournament on goals scored as Spain, needing an 11-goal victory to qualify, trounced minnows Malta 12–1 in their final qualifying game.

There was further frustration in 1985 when the Dutch missed out on qualification for the World Cup at the hands of neighbours Belgium in a play-off. Having lost 1–0 in Belgium, the Netherlands appeared to be set for qualification in Rotterdam as they led 2–0 until a late Georges Grün goal put Belgium through on away goals.

Gullit, however, was one of the key players for the Netherlands as he helped his country win Euro 1988 under coach Rinus Michels. Having lost their opening game of the tournament to the Soviet Union, the Netherlands beat England and the Republic of Ireland to reach the semi-finals. After defeating West Germany 2–1 in Hamburg, the Netherlands faced the Soviet Union again in the final. Gullit opened the scoring with a header and Marco van Basten scored a volley from a narrow angle to cap a 2–0 win. Gullit was thus the first Dutch captain to hold aloft international silverware.

The Dutch travelled to the 1990 World Cup as one of the favourites, but the team failed to perform as expected. There was also internal trouble related to selection of the national team coach (players consulted had voted for Johan Cruijff, but the Dutch FA and especially its leader Rinus Michels snubbed them and chose Leo Beenhakker). Gullit's knee injuries also hampered his play, but his dribble and shot against Ireland helped the Netherlands qualify for the second round. There they met West Germany, in a game marred by an altercation between Frank Rijkaard and Rudi Völler. The Germans gained revenge for their defeat at Euro 1988 by beating the Netherlands 2–1 and going on to win the tournament.

1992 saw the Netherlands again among the favourites for silverware in Sweden at Euro 1992. Gullit appeared in strong form against Scotland in their opening game of the tournament as he supplied Dennis Bergkamp with a goal. But after drawing with Russia and beating Germany, the Netherlands suffered a shock exit on penalties to Denmark, who ended up winning the championship's Henri Delaunay Trophy.

In 1993, Gullit and Netherlands manager Dick Advocaat began what was to be a long-running dispute which ultimately ended Gullit's international career. Advocaat's decision to play Gullit on the right side of midfield in a game against England at Wembley, rather than his usual central position, upset Gullit and this was exacerbated by his substitution for Marc Overmars. Gullit refused to play for the national team following this but later changed his mind and agreed to return, facing Scotland in May 1994. Shortly before the 1994 World Cup, Gullit walked out of the pre-tournament training camp and would never play international football again. In December 2013, while appearing on Dutch television program Studio Voetbal, Gullit and Advocaat stated they were both at fault in the matter and regretted it.

Style of play 

A complete and versatile player, Gullit epitomised the ethos of Total Football as he was naturally adept in several positions, and was capable of aiding his team defensively as well as offensively due to his work-rate, ball-winning abilities, and tactical intelligence in addition to his skill and physical qualities. Normally deployed as an attacking midfielder or as a second striker, he was capable of playing anywhere in midfield or along the front-line, on either wing or even in the centre, and could also play as a sweeper. Regarded as one of the greatest players of all time, his foremost attribute was his athleticism, as he used his strength and speed, combined with his technique, to great effect; he was also strong in the air, as he was tall, powerful, and an excellent jumper. Yet, unusually for a man of his stature, Gullit was an elegant player, who also possessed outstanding natural balance, poise, technical ability, and dribbling skills, which gave a graceful style to his game. Gullit also was noted for his intelligence, creativity, vision, and spatial abilities, qualities that helped him score goals early in his career and enabled him to play in a deeper role as a playmaker late in his days, where he was known for creating chances for teammates. Gullit thus combined physical presence with flair, mental acuity, formidable technique and natural touch, to become an iconic figure in world football. He was also an accurate free kick taker. Beyond his qualities as a footballer, Gullit also stood for his leadership and tenacity. Despite his talent, however, he struggled with injuries throughout his career, which later affected his fitness.

Gullit's brilliance prompted George Best to comment in 1990, "Ruud Gullit is a great player by any standards. He has all the skills. He's not afraid to do things with the ball. And he looks as if he's enjoying every second of it. By my reckoning that's what makes him an even better player than Maradona. Both have the key quality you will find in all the best players: balance. You just can't knock them off the ball. It was the same with Pelé, Beckenbauer and Cruyff."

Managerial career

Chelsea 

In the summer of 1996, when Glenn Hoddle left Chelsea to become manager of the England national team, Gullit was appointed as a player-manager becoming the first Dutch manager in the Premier League. Gullit made a promising start to his managerial career when in the first season as a player-manager he guided Chelsea to an FA Cup triumph in 1997, the club's first major trophy in 26 years. In doing so he became the first manager from outside the British Isles and the first black manager to win a major British football trophy. The club also finished at a creditable sixth place in the Premiership.

The following season, with Chelsea in second place in the Premiership and proceeding to the quarter-finals in two cup competitions, he was sacked, allegedly for a disagreement with the club's board over compensation, though Gullit himself disputed this. He was replaced by Gianluca Vialli, a man he had helped to bring to the club, and who went on to guide them to UEFA Cup Winners' Cup and Football League Cup glory over the remainder of the season. Gullit's last appearance as a player came in the first leg of that season's League Cup semi-final against Arsenal, but Gullit was sacked before the second leg. After Gullit's controversial sacking by Chelsea, chairman Ken Bates said of Gullit, "I didn't like his arrogance – in fact I never liked him."

Newcastle United 

In August 1998, Gullit was named manager of Newcastle United two games into the new league season and reached the 1999 FA Cup Final in his first year. Fans remained supportive despite a poor run of results, although a well-publicised contretemps with the team's top scorer Alan Shearer and captain Robert Lee did not put him in a favourable light. Gullit even refused to assign Lee a squad number, giving Lee's number 7 to new signing Kieron Dyer. In a match between Newcastle and local rivals Sunderland following the latter's return to the Premiership, Gullit left the usual starting strikers Shearer and Duncan Ferguson on the bench. Newcastle lost 2–1, and Gullit resigned three days later, five games into the 1999–2000 season.

Feyenoord 

Before the start of the 2004–05 season, Gullit took charge of Feyenoord, quitting at the end of that season without winning any trophies, being replaced by Erwin Koeman. Feyenoord had finished a disappointing fourth in the Eredivisie, behind Ajax, PSV and AZ.

Los Angeles Galaxy 

On 8 November 2007, Gullit became head coach for the LA Galaxy, signing a three-year contract. His US$2 million per year salary was the highest ever given to a Major League Soccer (MLS) head coach. Gullit arrived as replacement for Frank Yallop who was let go after Galaxy failed to make the 2007 MLS playoffs despite having record signing David Beckham on the roster.

From the start, Gullit's time with Galaxy was troublesome. Not well-versed in the intricacies and specifics of the MLS such as salary cap and draft rules, the Dutchman never adapted well to the North American league. The ill-fated acquisition in January 2008 of left back Celestine Babayaro, who was signed on Gullit's personal wishes before being dismissed without playing a competitive match, set the tone for the league campaign. After losing 0–4 in the season opener, Gullit clashed with midfielder Peter Vagenas, who criticized him for completely neglecting set-play practice during training.

As the season progressed, Gullit clashed with several players, notably Landon Donovan and Abel Xavier, the latter who criticized Gullit's managerial style and claimed he did not have respect for most of the players. It was later reported that Gullit's appointment had been made in controversial fashion as Galaxy general manager, Alexi Lalas, had been bypassed in the process, with the decision being led by David Beckham's advisers: his management company 19 Entertainment and his personal manager Terry Byrne.

On 11 August 2008, Gullit resigned as coach of the Galaxy, citing personal reasons. This came following a seven-game winless streak. General manager Lalas was fired at the same time.

Terek Grozny 

On 18 January 2011, Russian Premier League side Terek Grozny announced that Gullit has agreed to sign a year-and-a-half contract and become the head coach for the Chechen side. Upon signing, Gullit told Sovetsky Sport, "I'd like to believe that I can bring joy into the lives of the Chechen people through football... Of course, I won't deny that I'm getting lots of money from Terek." Gullit was let go by the club on 14 June 2011.

Media career 

In 1988, Gullit scored a No. 3 hit with the anti-apartheid song "South Africa" in the Dutch Top 40 together with the reggae band Revelation Time. Previously, he had a modest hit in 1984 with the song "Not the Dancing Kind". Gullit also notably joined his band in front of 3000 people at concerts in Italy, in the year he made a move to AC Milan.

After his spell at Newcastle, Gullit spent several years working as a football commentator, having previously coined the term "sexy football" during his spell as a BBC pundit for Euro 1996 while still playing professionally for Chelsea. Gullit used the term to describe teams, such as Portugal at that tournament, who played attractive football with an emphasis on the defense-penetrating pass-and-move game.

By 2006, Gullit had a talk show on Dutch TV, where he has interviewed, amongst others, Nelson Mandela. When Gullit was named winner of the Ballon d'Or in 1987, he dedicated the award to the then imprisoned Nelson Mandela. Gullit has since said in interviews that he met Mandela after he was released, and that Mandela had said to him, "Ruud, I have lots of friends now. When I was on the inside, you were one of the few."

In 2007, Gullit recalled, "Four months ago I visited Robben Island and met three guys who were cell-mates of Nelson Mandela. They remembered me dedicating my award in 1987 to Mandela and they said they couldn't believe what I had done, and were sure the football authorities would withdraw the award. That's what apartheid did to them, it made them believe injustice was a normal part of life."

Gullit also appeared as a pundit for ITV during the 2006 World Cup and works as an analyst for Champions League games on Sky Sports and Al Jazeera Sports. During the 2010 FIFA World Cup, Gullit worked as a studio analyst alongside former players Jürgen Klinsmann and Steve McManaman for ESPN. He subsequently worked as an analyst for Al Jazeera Sports during Euro 2012 alongside Glenn Hoddle and Terry Venables, among others.

In 2013, Gullit and many other former footballers were brought into EA Sports's FIFA 14 as "Legends" cards in FIFA Ultimate Team; his card is one of the highest rated in the game.

In 2014, Gullit joined BBC's Match of the Day as a studio pundit and first appeared during the 2014–15 season.

Gullit embarked on the Heineken Champions League Trophy Tour in 2016 where he visited Vietnam with Carles Puyol. For the 2022 World Cup, Gullit worked for BeIN Sports and has continued to do so for the UEFA Champions League coverage for the 2022-23 season.

Personal life 

Gullit is a Feyenoord supporter. His son Maxim Gullit plays for Cambuur.

Career statistics

Club

International 

Scores and results list the Netherlands' goal tally first, score column indicates score after each Gullit goal.

Managerial statistics 

All competitive league games (league and domestic cup) and international matches (including friendlies) are included.

Honours

Player 

HFC Haarlem

 Eerste Divisie: 1980–81

Feyenoord

 Eredivisie: 1983–84
 KNVB Cup: 1983–84

PSV

 Eredivisie: 1985–86, 1986–87

AC Milan

 Serie A: 1987–88, 1991–92, 1992–93
 Supercoppa Italiana: 1992, 1994
 European Cup: 1988–89, 1989–90
 UEFA Super Cup: 1990
 Intercontinental Cup: 1990

Sampdoria

 Coppa Italia: 1993–94

Netherlands

 UEFA European Championship: 1988

Individual

 Dutch Footballer of the Year: 1984, 1986
 Dutch Golden Shoe: 1986
 Dutch Sportsman of the Year: 1987
 Ballon d'Or: 1987; Runner-up 1988
 World Soccer Magazine World Footballer of the Year: 1987, 1989
 UNICEF European Footballer of the Season: 1987–88
 Onze de Onze: 1987, 1988, 1989
 Onze d'Argent: 1988, 1989
 UEFA European Championship Team of the Tournament: 1988, 1992
 FIFA XI: 1991
 Premier League PFA Team of the Year: 1995–96
 Chelsea Player of the Year: 1996
 FIFA 100
 UEFA Golden Jubilee Poll: #13
 Golden Foot: 2011, as football legend
 AC Milan Hall of Fame
 The Best of The Best – Player of the Century: Top 50
 World Soccer: The 100 Greatest Footballers of All Time
 FAI International Football Awards – International Personality: 2008
 IFFHS Legends
 Italian Football Hall of Fame: 2017

Manager 

Chelsea

 FA Cup: 1996–97

Bibliography 

 Ruud Gullit: My Autobiography (1998) with Harry Harris
 Kijken naar voetbal (2016); English translations: How to Watch Football (2016), How to Watch Soccer (2017)

References

Further reading

External links 

  
 
 Gullit's emotional South African journey – fifa.com/worldcup/ – FIFA, 2007
 
 European Champions Cup/UEFA Champions League Winning Squads

1962 births
Living people
Dutch sportspeople of Surinamese descent
Footballers from Amsterdam
Dutch footballers
Association football midfielders
Association football forwards
Association football utility players
AFC DWS players
HFC Haarlem players
Feyenoord players
PSV Eindhoven players
A.C. Milan players
U.C. Sampdoria players
Chelsea F.C. players
Eerste Divisie players
Eredivisie players
Serie A players
Premier League players
Netherlands under-21 international footballers
Netherlands international footballers
UEFA Euro 1988 players
1990 FIFA World Cup players
UEFA Euro 1992 players
UEFA European Championship-winning captains
UEFA European Championship-winning players
Ballon d'Or winners
World Soccer Magazine World Player of the Year winners
FIFA 100
Dutch expatriate footballers
Dutch expatriate sportspeople in Italy
Dutch expatriate sportspeople in England
Expatriate footballers in Italy
Expatriate footballers in England
Association football player-managers
Dutch football managers
Chelsea F.C. managers
Newcastle United F.C. managers
Feyenoord managers
LA Galaxy coaches
FC Akhmat Grozny managers
Premier League managers
Eredivisie managers
Major League Soccer coaches
Russian Premier League managers
Dutch expatriate football managers
Dutch expatriate sportspeople in the United States
Dutch expatriate sportspeople in Russia
Expatriate football managers in England
Expatriate soccer managers in the United States
Expatriate football managers in Russia
Dutch association football commentators
Dutch male singers
Knights of the Order of Orange-Nassau

it:Roberto Goveani